The Ekolot JK 01A Elf is a Polish mid-wing, single-seat motor glider, designed by Jerzy Krawczyk and produced by Ekolot of Krosno. Production has ended, but when it was available it was provided as a complete ready-to-fly aircraft or as a kit for amateur construction. It was superseded in production by the improved Ekolot KR-010 Elf.

Design and development
The JK 01A Elf was designed by Krawczyk, based on the earlier work of American designer Alex Strojnikun. It features cantilever wings, a single-seat enclosed cockpit under a bubble canopy, fixed landing gear and a single engine in pusher configuration.

The aircraft is made from composites. The standard engine used was a  JPX D-320 two-stroke, but this engine is no longer available and any small horizontally-opposed engine in the  range can be used. The landing gear uses dual, close-set mainwheels and a smaller nosewheel, with no wingtip wheels.

The company provides complete ready-to-fly aircraft and kits which offer the aircraft in various states of completion.

The first flight was made on 8 July 2006. There is no evidence of production beyond 2007/8.

Specifications (JK 01A Elf)

See also

References

External links
Official website archives
Official photos

2000s Polish sailplanes
Homebuilt aircraft
Ekolot aircraft
Aircraft first flown in 2006
Single-engined pusher aircraft